John James McCarthy (22 April 1884 – 29 June 1939) was an Australian rules footballer who played for St Kilda in the Victorian Football League (VFL).

Notes

External links 

1884 births
1939 deaths
St Kilda Football Club players
Australian rules footballers from Ballarat